Marty Embry (born March 28, 1964) is an American chef, entrepreneur and retired professional basketball player.

Basketball career 
At 6'9, 270 lbs., he was drafted out of DePaul University in the 4th round of the 1986 NBA draft by the Utah Jazz. He played professionally for 13 seasons. He played for the following teams in Europe and Asia: 
86, Jersey Jammers
86–87 Tenerife AB, Spain
87–88 Castor's, Belgium
88–89 Castor's, Belgium
89–90 Pasabahce, Turkey
90–91 Pasabahce, Turkey
91–92 Pasabahce, Turkey
92 Pensacola, Florida (CBA)
92–93 Ferrara, Italy
93–94 Ferrara, Italy
94–95 Desio, Italy
95–96 Pistoia, Italy
96–97 Roma, Italy
97–98 Pozzuoli, Italy
98–99 Aisin Seahorses, Japan.

Business career 
He has owned multiple businesses including his most recent restaurant called “51 To Go” which was located in his hometown of Flint, Michigan. He is the author of 8 cookbooks and a self help book called Diary of a Depressive.

Personal life 
He was born in Pine Bluff, Arkansas. He has a wife and two kids, including his son Jovan. Jovan, at 6'11, committed to play for Mississippi Valley State University in June 2016 and is currently a professional basketball player. They are the cousins of Wayne Embry, who won an NBA championship with the Boston Celtics in 1968.

References

1964 births
Living people
African-American chefs
American men's basketball players
American expatriate basketball people in Belgium
American expatriate basketball people in Italy
American expatriate basketball people in Japan
American expatriate basketball people in Turkey
Centers (basketball)
DePaul Blue Demons men's basketball players
Flint Central High School alumni
Olimpia Basket Pistoia players
SeaHorses Mikawa players
Sportspeople from Pine Bluff, Arkansas
Utah Jazz draft picks
Chefs from Michigan
American male chefs
American chefs
United States Basketball League players
21st-century African-American people
20th-century African-American people